Séverine Cornamusaz (born 1975, Lausanne, Switzerland) is a Swiss-French film director. In 2009 her first film Cœur animal won the Prix du cinéma suisse Best Film, and Best Actor was won by Antonio Buil.

References

External links
 

1975 births
Living people
Swiss film directors
Swiss women film directors
People from Lausanne